Archduchess Maria Carolina of Austria (born and died 17 September 1748) was the tenth child and the seventh daughter of Empress Maria Theresa and Holy Roman Emperor Francis I.

Biography
Maria Carolina was the second of the children of Maria Theresa to bear the name: her elder sister with the same name had died in 1741 at the age of one year old. The second Maria Carolina also died in infancy. Particularly traumatic was the fact that she died during the birth, necessitating an emergency baptism. The baby failed to turn in the womb and so presented feet first for birth. As it became evident that the child would not survive, the surrounding women began weeping and the sacrament on the altar was hurriedly prepared for worship. It was considered of the utmost importance that the child be baptized while still living, since according to traditional Catholic belief unbaptized infants would spend eternity in limbo. Maria Theresa’s physician Gerard van Swieten assured her that the infant was still living when baptized, but many at court doubted this. The baby’s body was placed in the Summer Room in Schönbrunn Palace (like other newborn children), so that the members of the court might assure themselves that she was a normal child and not malformed, but was not formally displayed. The baby was buried in the Imperial Crypt.

Maria Theresa continued to treasure the memory of her tenth child. In 1748, she commissioned the painter Martin van Meytens to paint the three daughters who had died in infancy. Maria Carolina appears in the center of the picture, flanked by her namesake and the eldest daughter Maria Elisabeth. After the sudden death in 1765 of Maria Theresa’s husband Francis I, she commissioned from Franz Anton Maulbertsch a mural in the "Giant Hall" of the Hofburg in Innsbruck. The mural shows her four daughters who died in childhood, crowned with floral wreathes and sitting on clouds: in the foreground is Johanna Gabriele, who died in 1762 from smallpox at the age of twelve, behind her Maria Elisabeth (the firstborn) at the age of three years, then Maria Carolina, who died shortly after her first birthday, and in the far background, only visible as a shadowy putto (cherub), the second Maria Carolina, who did not live an hour.

The name Maria Carolina was given again in 1752 to Maria Theresa’s thirteenth child. The third Maria Carolina became Queen of Naples and Sicily.

Ancestry

References

Bibliography

 
 Iby, Elfriede: "Marie-Thérèse, biographie d'une souveraine".
 

1748 births
1748 deaths
18th-century Austrian people
18th-century Austrian women
House of Habsburg
Austrian princesses
Burials at the Imperial Crypt
Daughters of emperors
Stillbirth
Children of Maria Theresa
Royalty and nobility who died as children
Daughters of kings